is a Japanese voice actress. She was represented by the Pro-Fit talent agency until 2014. She has been represented by Office Osawa since 2015. She played leading roles in several anime series, including Meiko "Menma" Honma in Anohana: The Flower We Saw That Day, Inori Yuzuriha in Guilty Crown, Alice Zuberg in Sword Art Online: Alicization, Utaha Kasumigaoka in Saekano: How to Raise a Boring Girlfriend, Mashiro Shiina in The Pet Girl of Sakurasou, Saori Takebe in Girls und Panzer, Shiro in No Game No Life, Darkness in KonoSuba, and Mamako Oosuki in Do You Love Your Mom and Her Two-Hit Multi-Target Attacks?. She has also performed opening, ending and insert theme songs for each series.

Biography
Kayano wanted to work in a job that would involve "healing people", leading to initially take up a course at a vocational school. She worked in the beauty industry and became interested in acting, after watching Aria. While attending school, Kayano continued working in the industry and paid for her tuition.

Kayano began working at Pro-Fit in 2010, starring in the original video animation Princess Resurrection. She also voiced a number of background roles in the anime series A Certain Magical Index II, playing Itsuwa. She voiced Meiko "Menma" Honma in Anohana: The Flower We Saw That Day. Kayano, Haruka Tomatsu and Saori Hayami performed the series' ending theme "Secret Base – Kimi ga Kureta Mono (10 years after Ver.)", a cover of a song originally sung by the band Zone. For her role as Menma, she received the Best Newcomer Award at the 6th Seiyu Awards in 2012. Kayano played the role of Inori Yuzuriha in Guilty Crown.

She also played the roles of Mashiro Shiina in The Pet Girl of Sakurasou, and Saori Takebe in Girls und Panzer. She played several roles in 2013, including the roles of Ai Fuyuumi in Oreshura, and Chisaki Hiradaira in Nagi-Asu: A Lull in the Sea. 

In 2014, Kayano played Shiro in No Game No Life. She performed the series' ending theme "Oración". Later that year, she left Pro-Fit and became a freelancer. Kayano joined Office Osawa in 2015. Later that year, she played Megumi Sakura in School-Live!, and Utaha Kasumigaoka in Saekano: How to Raise a Boring Girlfriend. In 2016, she played the roles of Darkness in KonoSuba, Chizuru Hishiro in ReLIFE, and Rin Tōyama in New Game!. In 2017, she played Kirie Sakurame in UQ Holder. She also played Shuvi in No Game No Life: Zero.

In 2016, Kayano hosted a show titled  at Animate Times' YouTube channel. The show focuses on her looking through into various types of sake.

Controversy
In 2021, controversy arose on Chinese social media as a result of Kayano's post regarding her February 11 trip to the Yasukuni Shrine, a Shinto shrine often a subject of controversy which enshrines Japanese men, women, children, and soldiers who died in numerous wars involving Japan spanning between the Meiji and Showa eras, including 1,068 convicted war criminals that were sentenced to death by the International Military Tribunal; of which 14 of them, including former Japanese Prime Minister Hideki Tojo, are labeled as A-Class criminals. In response, her voice was removed from six characters in the Chinese version of Azur Lane. Similar action was also taken in other games such as the removal of Kayano's voice lines from Punishing: Gray Raven and the Chinese version of Arknights, which are, respectively, replaced her voice with that of Miku Itō and Mizuki Kitajima for all servers in 2021.

Filmography

Anime

Film

Video games

Drama CDs

Dubbing

Awards

Notes

References

External links
  
 
 Ai Kayano at Oricon 

1987 births
Living people
Japanese video game actresses
Japanese voice actresses
Japanese YouTubers
Voice actresses from Tokyo
21st-century Japanese actresses